Suresh Chandra was an Indian politician, elected to the Lok Sabha, the lower house of the Parliament of India as a member of the Indian National Congress.

References

External links
Official biographical sketch in Parliament of India website

India MPs 1952–1957
Lok Sabha members from Maharashtra
1912 births
Year of death missing